This is a list of broadcast television stations that are licensed in the U.S. state of Texas.

Full-power stations
VC refers to the station's PSIP virtual channel. RF refers to the station's physical RF channel.

Defunct full-power stations
Channel 12: KVLF-TV – Alpine (9/1961 – 12/1963, satellite of KVKM-TV of Odessa/Midland)
Channel 13: KVTV – Laredo (1973 – 2016)
Channel 16: KVVV-TV – Ind. – Galveston (3/25/1968 – 8/31/1969)
Channel 18: KDCD-TV – Midland (12/9/1961 – 2/16/1962 and 1/15/1968 – 3/16/1971)
Channel 19: KETX – NBC/CBS/ABC/DuMont – Tyler (8/24/1953 – 10/23/1954)
Channel 19: KTES – Ind. – Nacogdoches (9/20/1958 – 8/25/1959)
Channel 19: KAEC-TV – CBS – Nacogdoches (7/30/1969 – 3/18/1970)
Channel 21: KFWT – Ind. – Fort Worth (9/19/1967 – 9/5/1969)
Channel 22: KVDO-TV – Corpus Christi (6/9/1954 – 8/19/1957)
Channel 23: KRET-TV – ETV – Richardson (2/29/1960 – 5/?/1970)
Channel 24: KIDZ-TV – satellite of KERA-TV – Wichita Falls (1974–1980)
Channel 31: KBMT – NBC/CBS/ABC/DuMont – Beaumont (4/9/1954 – 8/1/1956)
Channel 32: KTVE (Texas) – Longview/Tyler (10/24/1953 – 12/23/1955)
Channel 33: KMEC-TV – Ind. – Dallas (10/1/1967 – 10/1968 as KMEC-TV, 2/21/1972 – 12/6/1972 as KBFI-TV, 4/16/1973 – 11/14/1973 as KXTX-TV)
Channel 34: KANG-TV – NBC/CBS/ABC/DuMont – Waco (11/1/1953 – 12/31/1955)
Channel 34: KMXN-TV – Lubbock (10/20/1967 – 7/21/1970 and 10/24/1970 – 12/31/1972)
Channel 34: KDYW – PBS – Waco (5/22/1989 – 7/31/2010)
Channel 39: KNUZ-TV – Houston (10/10/1953 – 6/25/1954)

LPTV stations

Translators

See also
 List of television stations in Texas (by channel number)
 Texas media
 List of newspapers in Texas
 List of radio stations in Texas
 Media of cities in Texas: Abilene, Amarillo, Austin, Beaumont, Brownsville, Dallas, Denton, El Paso, Fort Worth, Houston, Killeen, Laredo, Lubbock, McAllen, McKinney, Midland, Odessa, San Antonio, Waco, Wichita Falls
 List of Spanish-language television networks in the United States
 Mexican television stations serving cities in Texas:
 Television stations in Chihuahua
 Television stations in Coahuila
 Television stations in Nuevo León
 Television stations in Tamaulipas

References

Bibliography

External links
  (Directory ceased in 2017)
 Texas Association of Broadcasters
 
 
 

Texas

Television stations